Søren Andkjer Jensen (born 7 November 1942) is a former Danish handball player who competed in the 1972 Summer Olympics.

He played his club handball with Efterslægten. In 1972 he was part of the Danish team which finished thirteenth in the Olympic tournament. He played four matches and scored one goal.

External links
Sports-Reference profile

1942 births
Living people
Danish male handball players
Olympic handball players of Denmark
Handball players at the 1972 Summer Olympics